USS Pivot (AM-276), an , and the first ship of the United States Navy named Pivot. She was built at the Gulf Shipbuilding Corporation, Chickasaw, Alabama and christened on 11 November 1943 by Mrs Clara L Prouty. Trials started on 12 July 1944 in the Gulf of Mexico and she worked up in Chesapeake Bay.

After shakedown, she operated with the Atlantic Fleet training and patrolling until sailing for the Pacific early in April 1945. She transited the Panama Canal on 10 April 1945 and after training in Hawaiian waters reached the war zone in time for mine sweeping operations around the Ryukyus after the Battle of Okinawa.

She supported Admiral Marc Mitscher's Fast Carrier Task Force during the strikes against Japan in July and operated in Korean waters after Japan's surrender, returning to Okinawa in October and resumed mine sweeping operations in the Ryukyus and receiving four battle stars for World War II.

Pivot was decommissioned 6 November 1946 at Subic Bay, Philippines, sold to Taiwan 27 August 1948 and renamed ROCS Yung Shou. On 1 July 1970, Yung Shou was decommissioned.

Images

References

External links

 

Admirable-class minesweepers
Ships built in Chickasaw, Alabama
1943 ships
World War II minesweepers of the United States
Admirable-class minesweepers of the Republic of China Navy